Line 30 may refer to:

 CFL Line 30
 Line 30 (Chengdu Metro), a metro line currently under construction of the Chengdu Metro in China